Platymantis mimulus, commonly known as the Japanese bullet frog, is a species of frog in the family Ceratobatrachidae. It is endemic to the Philippines, where it occurs on Mount Makiling and vicinity.

Its natural habitats are subtropical or tropical dry forests, subtropical or tropical moist lowland forests, subtropical or tropical moist montane forests, pastureland, plantations, rural gardens, and heavily degraded former forest.

References

Platymantis
Amphibians of the Philippines
Amphibians described in 1997
Taxonomy articles created by Polbot